The Storm is a 1916 American silent drama film directed by Frank Reicher and starring Blanche Sweet and Thomas Meighan. Beatrice deMille and Leighton Osmun provided the story and scenario for the film. It is not known whether the film currently survives.

Cast
Blanche Sweet - Natalie Raydon
Theodore Roberts - Prof. Octavius Raydon
Thomas Meighan - Robert Fielding
Richard Sterling - Sheldon Avery
Chandler House - David

See also
Blanche Sweet filmography

References

External links

 
 

1916 films
1916 drama films
American silent feature films
Silent American drama films
American black-and-white films
Famous Players-Lasky films
Paramount Pictures films
Films directed by Frank Reicher
1910s American films
1910s English-language films